In 2019, the top 50 Dutch law firms had around 4,476 attorneys and the top 30 law firms had around 183 notaries and 527 candidate notaries. According to the Chambers and Partners legal directory, the top five law firms in the Netherlands are  Allen & Overy Netherlands, De Brauw Blackstone Westbroek, Houthoff, Loyens & Loeff and Stibbe. Every year advocatie.nl publishes a list of the 50 biggest law firms in headcount.

Structure

Bigger law firms in the Netherlands are often organised as a partnership, private limited liability company (B.V. or ), public company (N.V. or )) or cooperative. It is common for a law firm to have notaries attached to it. Smaller law firms sometimes opt for a maatschap, where all lawyers run their own offices, but share the costs of rent, employees and marketing.

Largest Law Firms

Attorneys

A list of law firms (in alphabetical order) with more than 100 attorneys in the Netherlands in 2020 is set out below.

Notes:

(1) 2019/2020, including notarial revenue.

(2) In 1991, Benelux law firm, Loeff Claeys Verbeke, formed a tripartite alliance with Magic Circle law firm Allen & Overy and French law firm Gide Loyrette Nouel. Allen & Overy and Gide Loyrette Nouel terminated their alliance in 1998. After it was unable to agree on a full merger with Allen & Overy, in 2000, a third of the Amsterdam, Brussels and Luxembourg offices of Loeff Claeys Verbeke merged with Allen & Overy to form Allen & Overy Belgium, Luxembourg and Netherlands, a third merged with tax advisers Loyens & Volkmaars to form Loyens & Loeff and a third left the firm. At its height, Loeff Claeys Verbeke had more than 500 attorneys and notaries.

(3) Allen & Overy was founded in the City of London on 1 January 1930. 

(4) Allen & Overy does not separately report its revenue for the Netherlands. In its 2019/20 financial year, it had global revenue of £1,69 billion.

(5) In 1998. De Brauw Blackstone Westbroek and three other European law firms entered into an alliance with Linklaters to form Linklaters & Alliance. In 2002, it terminated that alliance, choosing not to merge with Linklaters. It has since entered into a "best friends" alliance with BonelliErede (Italy), Bredin Prat (France), Hengeler Mueller (Germany), Slaughter and May (UK) and Uría Menéndez (Spain). 

(6) Clifford Chance does not separately report its revenue for the Netherlands. In its 2019/2020 financial year, it had global revenue of £1,8 billion.

(7) 2018/2019.

(8) In 2002, Silver Circle law firm Herbert Smith (now Herbert Smith Freehills) (UK), Gleiss Lutz (Germany) and Stibbe formed a tripartite alliance. In November 2011,  Gleiss Lutz and Stibbe voted against a merger with Herbert Smith. That alliance subsequently ended on 31 December 2011.

Notaries

A list of law firms (in alphabetical order) with more than 20 notaries and candidate notaries in the Netherlands in 2020 is set out below.

Rankings
Chambers and Partners rankings of the number of speciality areas in each law firm recognised as leading in the Netherlands in 2020. In the Netherlands, Chambers and Partners ranks law firms in bands from 1 (highest) to 4 (lowest). Being ranked in any band is an achievement. This list is non-exhaustive.

Associate remuneration

In 2019, the average gross annual salary for associates at Dutch law firms ranged between:
 €45,000 and €80,000 for one to four years' experience;
 €70,000 and €105,000 for four to seven years' experience; and
 €95,000 and €150,000 for more than seven years' experience.

References

Law firms of the Netherlands